The Drury Panthers are the athletic teams that represent Drury University, located in Springfield, Missouri, in NCAA Division II intercollegiate sports. The Panthers compete as members of the Great Lakes Valley Conference for all 18 varsity sports. Drury has been a member of the GLVC since 2005.

Varsity teams

List of teams
 
 
Men's sports (9) 
Baseball
Basketball
Cross country
Golf
Soccer
Swimming and diving
Tennis
Track and field
Wrestling

 
Women's sports (9) 
Basketball
Bowling 
Cross country
Golf
Soccer
Softball
Swimming and diving
Tennis
Track and field
Volleyball

National championships
The Panthers have twenty-three NCAA team national championships, the fourth-most among active Division II athletics program (Saint Augustine's, Adams State, and Florida Southern have more).

Team (23)

Individual teams

Baseball
Baseball, in hiatus since the 1970s, was reorganized for the 2007 season by new head coach Mark Stratton. Bill Virdon was the first Panther to make a start. Trevor Richards was the first alum to pitch a Major League Baseball win, for the Miami Marlins. The team plays home games at U.S. Baseball Park in nearby Ozark, Missouri.

Basketball
Mike Carter played for the Drury Panthers, who in 1978–79 were 33–2 and won the National Association of Intercollegiate Athletics national championship as he won the 1979 NAIA men's basketball tournament's Charles Stevenson Hustle Award, and who over his two seasons with the team were 62–6. He holds the school's two-year record in rebounds (480). He was inducted into the Drury Panthers Hall of Fame in 2008.

On April 7, 2013, Drury won the Division II Men's National Championship in Basketball, defeating Metro State of Denver 74–73 after rallying from a 17-point deficit. The Panthers won their final 23 games of the season – a school record – to finish 31–4 on the season. They also captured their second Great Lakes Valley Conference championship and first NCAA Division II Midwest Regional along the way. In keeping with recent custom, the Division II champions were invited to play an exhibition game against Duke University.

On June 24, 2021, Drury announced former NBA player Chris Carr will join the Panthers coaching staff as an assistant.

Swimming and diving
Also in 2007, Drury men's swimming head coach Brian Reynolds was inducted into the Missouri Sports Hall of Fame.

Wrestling
In 2016, Drury will field a wrestling program, the first in the Ozarks region in over 20 years. The addition means that the GLVC will have the required minimum of six teams to hold a conference championship tournament.

References

External links